

Inspiration is a ghost town in Gila County, Arizona, in the United States. Inspiration was the company town for the Inspiration mine.

The old Inspiration townsite is on company property, and is not accessible to the general public.

History
Inspiration had its start as a copper-mining settlement. According to tradition, the area was so named when a local prospector dreamed of finding a mine, and his dream came true. A post office called Inspiration was established in 1917, and remained in operation until it was discontinued in 1983.

At its peak population, Inspiration had between 350 and 400 people. There were 89 houses, three duplex apartment houses, the Benjamin Franklin School, the Warrior Store and service station, the Inspiration Post Office, and the telephone office.  As of 2013, only the school building, the gas station, and some walls and foundations remain.

Inspiration mine
The rich Inspiration copper mine opened in 1911. It was promoted by Boyce Thompson, who owned the nearby Magma mine in Superior, Arizona. He retained a 15% interest in the Inspiration Consolidated Copper Company when that was founded in 1915.

The mine is currently operated by Freeport-McMoran, who renamed it the Miami mine.

References

Featured in the film "A Kiss Before Dying " 1956 MGM Robert Wagner Joanne Woodward.

Ghost towns in Arizona
Unincorporated communities in Gila County, Arizona
Unincorporated communities in Arizona